Gilded Lily or The Gilded Lily may refer to:

Books and literature
Gilded Lily (character), a Marvel Comics supervillain character
The Case of the Gilded Lily, a 1956 novel in the Perry Mason series by Erle Stanley Gardner
The Gilded Lily, a 2012 historical novel by Deborah Swift
Gilded Lily,  a 2014 novel by Delphine Dryden

Film and television
The Gilded Lily (1921 film), starring Mae Murray
The Gilded Lily (1935 film), starring Claudette Colbert

Music
"Gilded Lily", a 1992 song by Gwar from America Must Be Destroyed
"Gilded Lily", a 2017 song by Cults from Offering

See also
Gild the Lily, a 1991 album by Chantoozies